Dynamic Multipoint Virtual Private Network (DMVPN) is a dynamic tunneling form of a virtual private network (VPN) supported on Cisco IOS-based routers, and Huawei AR G3 routers, and on Unix-like operating systems.

Benefits
DMVPN provides the capability for creating a dynamic-mesh VPN network without having to pre-configure (static) all possible tunnel end-point peers, including IPsec (Internet Protocol Security) and ISAKMP (Internet Security Association and Key Management Protocol) peers.  DMVPN is initially configured to build out a hub-and-spoke network by statically configuring the hubs (VPN headends) on the spokes, no change in the configuration on the hub is required to accept new spokes. Using this initial hub-and-spoke network, tunnels between spokes can be dynamically built on demand (dynamic-mesh) without additional configuration on the hubs or spokes. This dynamic-mesh capability alleviates the need for any load on the hub to route data between the spoke networks.

Technologies
 Generic Routing Encapsulation (GRE), or multipoint GRE if spoke-to-spoke tunnels are desired
 NHRP (next-hop resolution protocol), 
 IPsec (Internet Protocol Security) using an IPsec profile, which is associated with a virtual tunnel interface in IOS software. All traffic sent via the tunnel is encrypted per the policy configured (IPsec transform set)
 An IP-based routing protocol, EIGRP, OSPF, RIPv2, BGP or ODR (DMVPN hub-and-spoke only).

Internal routing
Routing protocols such as OSPF, EIGRP v1 or v2 or BGP are generally run between the hub and spoke to allow for growth and scalability.  Both EIGRP and BGP allow a higher number of supported spokes per hub.

Encryption
As with GRE tunnels, DMVPN allows for several encryption schemes (including none) for the encryption of data traversing the tunnels. For security reasons Cisco recommend that customers use AES.

Phases
DMVPN has three phases that route data differently.

 Phase 1: All traffic flows from spokes to and through the hub. 
 Phase 2: Start with Phase 1 then allows spoke-to-spoke tunnels based on demand and triggers.
 Phase 3: Starts with Phase 1 and improves scalability of and has fewer restrictions than Phase 2.

References

External links
Cisco Systems
DMVPN Management
Sites Unblocker Homepage
Cisco DMVPN Design Guide
What Is Double VPN And How To Use It
Open Source NHRP Protocol Implementation

Network architecture
Virtual private networks
Cisco protocols